Niemojki  is a village in the administrative district of Gmina Łosice, within Łosice County, Masovian Voivodeship, in east-central Poland.

The village has a population of 1,000.

References

Niemojki